Great American Mountain Rally (GAMR) was an automotive rally held in November in New England, United States. The course was 1500 miles long in harsh temperatures and cruel terrain. GAMR was possibly the first-ever US FIA-sanctioned rally.

In 1957, Saab 93 cars made headline news as three stock 93s entered into the competition and won first, third and fourth place in their class, as well as overall and team trophies.

Winners

1953
 Manufacturer's team prize - Sunbeam

1954
 Manufacturer's team prize - Sunbeam

1955
November 24–26
1 Kriplen-Richert (Porsche)
2 Blodgett-Rauch (Triumph TR2)
3 Bulck, W.-Bulck, E. (Austin-Healey)

1956
November 21-25
1 Lehmann-Brown (Saab)
2 Mackley-Hamlock (Renault)
3 Blackburn, D. and F. (Jaguar)
4 Young-Fendler (Volkswagen)
5 Hurtley, H. and A. (Triumph TR3)
6 Middle-Muskin (Saab)
7 Gatsonides-Blodgett (Triumph TR3)

1957
There has been no evidence discovered that the event ran through 1957; 1956 was the last year based upon all the documentation I have found. 1956 was the year that SAAB first came over and essentially swept the field.

 Winner Bob Wehman and Louis Braun, USA - Saab 93
 Manufacturer's team prize - SAAB

 Rally competitions in the United States